Murmur is a genus of placoderm.  The type species is Murmur arctatum.  It was described from a fossil found at Beartooth Butte, Wyoming.

References

Fossil taxa described in 1951
Placoderms